Brinay may refer to the following places in France:

Brinay, Cher, a commune in the department of Cher
Brinay, Nièvre, a commune in the department of Nièvre